East Kotawaringin Regency is one of the thirteen regencies which comprise the Central Kalimantan Province on the island of Kalimantan (Borneo), Indonesia. The population of East Kotawaringin Regency was 374,175 at the 2010 Census, and 428,900 at the 2020 Census; the official estimate as at mid 2021 was 432,283. The town of Sampit is the capital of East Kotawaringin Regency.

Administrative Districts 
At the 2010 Census, East Kotawaringin Regency consisted of fifteen districts (kecamatan), but two more districts (Tualan Hulu and Telaga Antang) were subsequently established by the splitting of existing districts. The seventeen districts are tabulated below with their areas and population totals from the 2010 Census and the 2020 Census, together with the official estimates as at mid 2021. The table also includes the locations of the district administrative centres, the number of administrative villages (rural desa and urban kelurahan) in each district, and its postal codes.

Notes: (a) except for the village of Mentaya Seberang, which has a post code of 74324. (b) the 2010 population of Tualan Hulu Disrict is included in the figures for the districts from which it was cut out. (c) the 2010 population of Telaga Antang District is included in the figure for Antang Kalang District. (d) except for the village of Buana Mustika, which has a post code of 74356.

References

Regencies of Central Kalimantan